Austrocidaria lithurga is a species of moth in the family Geometridae. It is endemic to New Zealand. This moth is classified as at risk, naturally uncommon by the Department of Conservation.

Taxonomy 
This species was first described by Edward Meyrick in 1911 and named Hydriomena lithurga. Meyrick used a specimen obtained from R. M. Sunley who had collected a pupa from a Muehlenbeckia plant at Mākara Beach, Wellington, in November and had raised the adult in captivity. George Hudson described and illustrated the species in his 1928 book The Butterflies and Moths of New Zealand. In 1971 John S. Dugdale assigned H. lithurga to the genus Austrocidaria.  Dugdale postulated that A. lithurga might prove synonymous with Austrocidaria prionota.

The holotype specimen is held at the Natural History Museum, London.

Description 
Meyrick originally described this species as follows:

Distribution 
This species is endemic to New Zealand. This species range is Wellington and Mid Canterbury. As well as the type locality, this species is recorded as having been collected at Sinclair Head and at Baring Head, both in Wellington. It has also been located in south Marlborough. It is possible that the species is also present at Little Bush, Puketitiri, in the Hawkes Bay.

Biology and life cycle 
The pupa of this species is attached to a loose cocoon. The adult moth is on the wing in October and November.

Host species and habitat 
Hudson hypothesised that the host plants of the larvae of this moth are Muehlenbeckia species and it has also been suggested that the host plants are divaricating small-leaved Coprosma species. However the precise host species for this moth is unknown as is its preferred habitat but it has been hypothesised that A. tithurga prefers open shrub-land.

Conservation status 
This moth is classified under the New Zealand Threat Classification System as being at risk, naturally uncommon.

References

External links

 Image of holotype specimen

Xanthorhoini
Moths of New Zealand
Moths described in 1911
Endemic fauna of New Zealand
Endangered biota of New Zealand
Taxa named by Edward Meyrick
Endemic moths of New Zealand